Steven Honigberg (born 17 May 1962) is an American cellist.  The son of pianist Carol Honigberg, Steven is a member of the National Symphony Orchestra and the Potomac String Quartet, and solos frequently; he is also known as a well-reviewed performer from David Ott's premier of Concerto for Two Cellos.  From 1994-2002, Honigberg served as chamber music series director at the United States Holocaust Memorial Museum.  Forty concerts and 4 CDs entitled "Darkness and Light," a CD of Ernst Toch's (1887–1964) cello compositions and a CD of Erich Wolfgang Korngold's (1897–1957) chamber music were produced under his artistry and leadership.

A native of Chicago, Honigberg studied there with Karl Fruh (1914–1999) at the Roosevelt University from the age of 13 to 17.  In Chicago, Honigberg presented eight performances of Tchaikovsky's "Variations on a Rococo Theme" with the Chicago Symphony Orchestra as a 16-year-old winner of Chicago's Youth Competition.  The summer before, while at Interlochen's Summer Music Camp, Honigberg, as a result of winning the 1978 Concerto Competition, performed with the World Youth Symphony as soloist in Bloch's "Schelomo", a performance that was recorded and released by the National Music Camp.

A student of famed American cellist Leonard Rose (1918–1984) and Channing Robbins (1922–1992), Honigberg graduated from the Juilliard School with a Master's Degree in 1984.  That same year, he soloed with the Juilliard Orchestra at Alice Tully Hall in Strauss' Don Quixote, presented his New York Debut recital as a competition winner in Carnegie Recital Hall and was chosen by Mstislav Rostropovich to become a member of the National Symphony Orchestra in Washington, D.C.

Published in 2010 and revised in 2013, Mr. Honigberg is author of LEONARD ROSE: AMERICA'S GOLDEN AGE and ITS FIRST CELLIST.  As a protege in Rose's final years, Honigberg retains the wealth of knowledge his subject imparted to students, as well as an abiding sympathy for the man.  That intimate relationship of the past provided unparalleled access to Rose's living colleagues and classes, from his best known pupils, Yo-Yo Ma, Lynn Harrell and Ronald Leonard, to internationally acclaimed stars with whom the pedagogue collaborated, such as Van Cliburn, Lorin Maazel, Emanuel Ax, Pinchas Zukerman, Itzhak Perlman and more. In February, 1988, the great cellist and conductor Mstislav Rostropovich, led the National Symphony Orchestra in the world premiere of the Concerto for Two Cellos, by David Ott, with David Teie and Honigberg, to whom the score is dedicated, as soloists.  The Washington Post headlined its review "Ott's Brilliant Premiere" and wrote "...the audience gave it a five-minute standing ovation."  The Washington Times reported, "It was a case of love at first hearing.  Mr. Rostropovich hugged and kissed the composer and his cellists as the packed house roared its approval."  A champion of the work, Rostropovich subsequently programmed the "Concerto for Two Cellos" on the NSO's 1989 and 1994 U.S. tours.  The cellists have played the work 30 times with numerous orchestras.  In addition, other first desk players have performed the work with their orchestras across the United States.

Honigberg is a member of the Washington, D.C. based Potomac String Quartet, which released landmark projects - the complete string quartets of David Diamond (1915–2005; eleven quartets on four CDs) and Quincy Porter (1897–1966; nine quartets on two CD's).  Honigberg also recorded Homage to Rostropovich (1927–2007), a CD of solo cello works written for the legendary cellist; Frédéric Chopin's complete works for cello and piano; Ludwig van Beethoven's complete works for cello and piano; and his debut American works CD (Barber, Bernstein, Schuller, Foss, Diamond) rounds out his current discography.

Honigberg is noted for explorations of new works, such as Lukas Foss' Anne Frank (1999), Benjamin Lees' Night Spectres (1999), Robert Stern's Hazkarah (1998), Robert Starer's Song of Solitude (1995), and David Diamond's Concert Piece'' (1993), all written for, premiered and recorded by the cellist.

From 1990-2009, Honigberg was principal cellist, chamber music director of the Edgar M. Bronfman series in Sun Valley, Idaho where he was featured as soloist with the summer symphony in concerti by Barber, Bartók, Bloch, Boccherini, Dvořák, Elgar, Goldschmidt, Haydn, Korngold, Popper, Saint-Saëns, Schumann, Shostakovich, Tchaikovsky, and Walton.

References

Further reading

Interview with Carol Honigberg and Steven Honigberg, November 15, 1993

Living people
American classical cellists
Juilliard School alumni
1962 births
Musicians from Chicago
Interlochen Center for the Arts alumni
Roosevelt University alumni
20th-century classical musicians
20th-century American musicians
21st-century classical musicians
21st-century American musicians
Classical musicians from Illinois
Centaur Records artists